Ulrich Meister (4 January 1838 – 3 February 1917) was a Swiss politician and President of the Swiss National Council (1902).

References

External links 
 
 

Members of the National Council (Switzerland)
Presidents of the National Council (Switzerland)
1838 births
1917 deaths